Saint-Faust is a commune in the Pyrénées-Atlantiques department in south-western France.

History

French historian Paul Raymond wrote that in 1385, Saint-Faust and its annex Laroin had 89 fires and depended on the bailiwick of Pau.

Monhauba is an old hamlet of Saint-Faust, destroyed in 1778 when the Gave de Pau river flooded.

Economy 

The town is part of the Appellation d'origine contrôlée (AOC) areas of Jurançon and Béarn for wine and that of Ossau-Iraty for cheese.

Population

See also
Communes of the Pyrénées-Atlantiques department

References

Communes of Pyrénées-Atlantiques